The 2012–13 season is Peterborough United's second consecutive season in the Championship.

Events of the season
June
 11 June - Mark Robson leaves to join Barnet as manager.
 29 June - Preston North End midfielder Paul Coutts rejects an offer to re-join Peterborough.

July
 4 July - Gavin Strachan is promoted to first team coach.
 5 July - Stevenage rejects a joint £1 million bid for Lawrie Wilson and Michael Bostwick.
 6 July  - Defender Gabriel Zakuani is named club captain.

November
 12 November - Tyrone Barnett, Nathaniel Mendez-Laing, Emile Sinclair and Gabriel Zakuani are placed on the transfer list following a breach of club discipline.

May
 4 May - Peterborough are relegated back to League One following a 3–2 loss at Crystal Palace.

Championship data

League table

Results summary

Squad

Statistics

|-
|colspan="14"|Players currently out on loan:

|-
|colspan="14"|Players who left during the course of the season:

|}

Goalscorers

Disciplinary record

Transfers

In

 Total spending:  ~ £2,300,000+

Notes
1Although officially undisclosed, the Peterborough Evening Telegraph reported the fee to be around £300,000.
2Although officially undisclosed, the Express and Star reported the fee to be £100,000.

Loans In

Out

Loans out

Fixtures and results

Pre-season Friendlies

Championship

FA Cup

League Cup

References

2012-13
2012–13 Football League Championship by team